David Rees (born 25 February 1943) is a Canadian former cross-country skier who competed in the 1968 Winter Olympics.

References

1943 births
Living people
Canadian male cross-country skiers
Olympic cross-country skiers of Canada
Cross-country skiers at the 1968 Winter Olympics